Gamal Hamdan (February 2, 1928 – April 17, 1993) was an Egyptian scholar and geographer. Among his most prominent books are The Character of Egypt, Studies of the Arab World, and The Contemporary Islamic World Geography, which form a trilogy on Egypt's natural, economic, political, and cultural character and its position in the world.

Birth

Hamdan was born in the Qalyubia Governorate on February 4, 1928. His father, a teacher of Arabic language, had been discharged from Al Azhar University educational institution on charges of participating in demonstrations in the Egyptian Revolution of 1919.

Education

He became enrolled in primary school at the age of eight. He then moved to the prestigious Tawfiqiyya secondary school, a school reputed for its high standards in education and sports facilities nationally. It was there he discovered his love and innate talent for geography.

Having completed his secondary education in 1944 with distinction, ranking sixth on the list of graduates nationwide, he joined the Department of Geography at the Cairo University.

At the age of twenty, he obtained his Bachelor of Arts with Distinction.

He was soon appointed as a staff member at the Faculty of Arts, where he was granted a scholarship at the University of Reading, UK to obtain his M.A. and Ph.D. degrees. There, he became a student of the eminent English geographer, professor Austen Miller

Major viewpoints and thoughts

Hamdan’s intellectual and geographical achievements constituted the most important accomplishment of the Egyptian geographical school, that stresses Egypt’s uniqueness and singularity in terms of time and place, of geography and history. In his works, he adopted a multi-disciplinary approach, encompassing geography, history, sociology, politics, and culture.

Hamdan’s writings manifest a unique wealth of knowledge, an immense power of meditation and observation, and a distinct, devoted love of Egypt. His was the connoisseur’s love of the components of a unique gem. Utilising these exceptional resources, Hamdan could delineate and interpret the Egyptian personality as influenced by location and geographical considerations.

Major works

Hamdan's legacy consisted of writing in both Arabic and English, including seventeen books in Arabic and eight in English, in addition to several articles in Arabic, published in newspapers, magazines and other publications.

The outlook of his writings are futuristic in nature, encompassing predictions on several major events considered by Hamdan to be either compatible or incompatible with geographical facts. One of these predictions was the disintegration of the Soviet Union.

Hamdan's encyclopedic work The Personality of Egypt, took ten years to complete using 245 Arabic language and 691 foreign language reference books. The book expounds the constituent factors making up the Egyptian personality since the early days of the Pharaohs.  Hamden considers Egypt to be the central chapter of the geography book, which turned into the opening chapter of the history book, maintaining a coherent civilization across history. Egypt, to Hamdan, was a unique unrepetitive geographical anomaly. Apart from the “Description of Egypt”, which appeared in print during the French Expedition to Egypt, The Personality of Egypt is considered an unprecedented scientific masterpiece on Egypt.

Main prizes and merit awards

Dr. Gamal Hamdan was awarded several scientific prizes and merit awards including:

 State Incentive Prize for Arts and Letters, 1959.
 State Merit Prize for Social Science, 1986.
 Scientific Criticism Award, by the State of Kuwait, 1986.
 Order of Merit of the First Class for Science and Arts, 1988.

In line with his full dedication to science and his almost ascetic attitude to formalities, he refused to break up with his self-imposed solitude. Apart from the first prize awarded to him in 1959, he refused to receive any of the other prizes.

Hamdan died on April 17, 1993. His works had a far-reaching impact on the entire field of social sciences that was almost tantamount to a revolution in geography. His unique literary style turned the science of geography into a universal, encyclopedic social science. Taking geography as an access road to other branches, he skilfully used this multi-disciplinary approach to study Egypt’s location, history, culture, and future.

Books

In Arabic

 Studies on the Arab World, Cairo, 1958.
 Patterns of Environments, Cairo, 1958.
 Study on Urban Geography, Cairo 1958.
 The Arab City, Cairo 1964.
 Arabs'Oil, Cairo, 1964.
 Colonisation and Liberation in the Arab World, Cairo, 1964.
 Anthropology of Jews, Dar el-Helal Publications, Cairo, 1967.
 Egypt's Identity, Dar el-Helal Publications, Cairo, 1967.
 The Strategy of Colonisation and Liberation, Cairo, 1978.
 Introduction to "Cairo" by Desmond Stewart, translated by Yehya Haqqi, 1969.
 The Contemporary Islamic World, Cairo, 1971.
 Between Europe and Aisa, A Study in the Geographic Counterparts, Cairo, 1972.
 The Arab Republic of Libya, A Study in Geopolitics, Cairo 1973.
 6 October War in the International Strategy, Cairo, 1974.
 The Suez Canal, Cairo, 1975.
 New Africa, Cairo, 1975.
 Egypt's Identity, A Study in the Genius of the Place, four volumes, Cairo, 1975-84.

In English 

 Population of the Nile Mid-Delta, Past and Present, Reading University, June 1953, 2 volumes.
 Khartoum : Study of a City, Geog. Review, 1956.
 Studies in Egyptian Urbanism, Cairo, 1960.
 Evolution of Irrigation and Agriculture in Egypt. A History of Land Use in Arid Regions, Ed. L.
 Dubley Stamp UNESCO, Paris, 1961.
 Egypt : the Land and the People, A Guide Book to Geology, 1962.
 Pattern of Medieval Urbanism in Arab World, Geog. Review, April 1962.
 A Political Map of the New Africa, Geog. Review October 1963.
 The Four Dimensions of Egypt.

See also
 Mohamed Riad

References

Cairo University alumni
1928 births
1993 deaths
Egyptian scholars
Human geographers
Egyptian geographers
20th-century geographers
Academic staff of Cairo University
Alumni of the University of Reading